"Gone" is a song and single by rock band Switchfoot. It was released on the 2003 double-platinum record, The Beautiful Letdown. Even though it was not released as an official mainstream radio single, the song was a No. 1 hit on Christian CHR radio.

In the media
Gone was featured in a scene on the Invisible Children DVD.

Live
This song was introduced to the band's live show during their 2003 tour supporting the original release of The Beautiful Letdown.  It is played at nearly every show, most likely due to the song's success on CCM radio stations.  Live performances of the song are characterized by fans enthusiastically singing along, especially during the song's coda.  During the bridge, guitarist Drew Shirley generally contributes additional lead lines not featured in the studio version.  During the Appetite for Construction Tour the band played "Gone" as a medley with Beyoncé's 2003 hit Crazy in Love, which the band covered for Pepsi Cover Art in 2007.

Charts

References

2003 singles
Switchfoot songs
Songs written by Tim Foreman
Songs written by Jon Foreman
2003 songs
Sony BMG singles